Jordan Ladd (borh January 14, 1975) is an American actress. The daughter of actress Cheryl Ladd and producer David Ladd, she initially worked with her mother in several made-for-television films, before making her big screen debut at 19, in the vampire film Embrace of the Vampire (1994). She subsequently appeared in the drama Nowhere (1997) and the comedy Never Been Kissed (1999). Ladd became known as a scream queen, having appeared in several successful horror films, including Cabin Fever (2002), Club Dread (2004), Death Proof (2007), and Grace (2009). Ladd is also known for work with director David Lynch appearing in his films Darkened Room (2002) and Inland Empire (2006).

Personal life

Background
Ladd was born January 14, 1975, in Hollywood, California, the daughter of Charlie's Angels star Cheryl Ladd (née Stoppelmoor) and David Ladd, a producer and former actor. Her parents divorced in 1980. Her paternal grandfather was Alan Ladd, an actor and producer of British descent, and her paternal grandmother was Sue Carol (née Evelyn Lederer), a Hollywood talent agent and actress of Jewish descent. She has a step-sister Lindsay Russell an aspiring actress.

She graduated from high school in 1993, managing to lead a normal life despite her family's fame; she once remarked: "When I was in high school I used to go to the clubs, and of course that's exciting [...] You want to drink before you can and get into places you can't. But once I started acting professionally, I really didn't want to do the Hollywood nightlife thing." She attended Southern Methodist University in Dallas, Texas.

Relationships
She married her longtime boyfriend, documentary film editor Conor O'Neill, in 2001. The couple divorced in July 2005.

Career

1990s
At the age of two, Ladd began appearing in commercials. Her first commercial was for Polaroid.  She began acting in film and television while in school, working with her mother in made-for-television films such as The Girl Who Came Between Them (1990) and Broken Promises: Taking Emily Back (1993). After graduating high school, she took up acting professionally.

In 1994, she guest-starred in an episode of the NBC series Saved by the Bell: The New Class and made her big screen debut with a supporting appearance as a campus slut, opposite Alyssa Milano, in the vampire film Embrace of the Vampire. She spent the majority of the 1990s appearing in a variety of independent films, including Inside Out, Nowhere, Stand-ins (all 1997), and Taking the Plunge (1999). In 1999, she landed her first high-profile role as a popular teenager who tortures an insecure copy editor in the teen comedy Never Been Kissed, alongside Drew Barrymore. The film was a commercial success, grossing US$84.5 million globally, and gave her an initial wide exposure with audiences.

2000s
Ladd appeared in The Specials (2000), a comedy about a group of superheroes on their day off; in the film she played a neurotic named Nightbird. By 2000, she also had starred as an actress who vying for an Academy Award in E! first original film Best Actress, and appeared in the critically acclaimed anthology film Boys Life 3.

Ladd starred as a college graduate and the victim to a flesh-eating virus in Eli Roth's directorial debut, the horror film Cabin Fever (2002). Ladd described as "insane" to work on the film, which began shooting just a month after 9/11. She remarked: "We shut down, we got up and running, and then we shut down again. We just hoped to finish the movie and hoped people would really understand and appreciate it. We had a blast doing it, even the tougher stuff. I'd rather work that way than on a big-budget fancy thing where you are completely separate from the process." It was with this film that her career would begin focusing on horror genre, as she had a "real education on that way of storytelling" with Roth and the film. Cabin Fever was largely praised by critics, and made US$30.5 million on a budget of US$1.5 million. She played a crying woman in David Lynch's Japanese-style horror short Darkened Room (also 2002).

In 2004, Ladd took on the role of a suspect in a recent string of murders on a vacationing island in the horror comedy Club Dread, and starred as a mental health facility nurse in the horror Madhouse. Her topless scene in Club Dread ranked 14th in Complex magazine's "15 Best Topless Moments In Mainstream Horror Movies". In 2005, she appeared opposite Anna Faris, Ryan Reynolds and Justin Long in the independent romantic comedy Waiting..., and in 2006, she briefly appeared in David Lynch's film Inland Empire, which also starred her mother.

Quentin Tarantino cast her as a wild, partying Texan and the victim of a killer stuntman in Death Proof, his high-speed segment of the double–feature exploitation horror Grindhouse (2007), alongside Rosario Dawson, Tracie Thoms, Zoë Bell, and Kurt Russell. The film flopped at the box office, but attracted significant media buzz and critical acclaim. Director Eli Roth, in his contribution to Grindhouse, worked again with Ladd in a fake promo called Thanksgiving, which she shot "on the fly over" in Prague, where Hostel: Part II was being filmed; in the horror sequel, she played the girlfriend of the sole survivor of the first film.

In her next film, the horror Grace (2009), Ladd portrayed a woman, who after a car accident, decides to carry her unborn baby to term anyway. The film was screened on the film festival circuit in North America, to critical acclaim. John Anderson of Variety felt that Ladd played her role with "tongue planted firmly in cheek", in what he described as "a satirical creepfest that mines modern motherhood for all its latent terrors". In 2009, she also starred in the made-for-television film The Wishing Well, as a journalist from New York City who gets sent to a small town in Illinois to report on a legendary wishing well.

2010s
Ladd filmed a comedic short film entitled First Dates, exploring the dating scene of several single people. The production premiered at the AFI screening room in Los Angeles on January 8, 2011. She starred in the fantasy romance film Awaken (2012), which premiered at the Newport Beach Film Festival, as a mysterious woman who changes  the mundane life of a man. In 2012, she also appeared in the direct-to-DVD disaster film Air Collision, as a stewardess, and in the thriller Murder on the 13th Floor, as a wife who discovers her husband is having an affair with the live-in nanny and decides to seek revenge.

In 2015, Ladd guest-starred in an episode of the YouTube horror anthology series Scary Endings, directed by John Fitzpatrick. In 2016, she reunited with Fitzpatrick for the short thriller film Brentwood Strangler, in which she played a lonely woman goes on a blind date with a man who, unbeknownst to her, was replaced by an active and notorious serial killer, opposite Adam J. Yeend and Annika Marks. She was cast in her role, following an introduction from Skypemare actress Cerina Vincent, who Ladd worked with on Cabin Fever. The 19-minute production premiered on film festival circuits in North America and Australia, to a positive critical response. Gruesome Magazine found Ladd to be a "delight" as an "emotionally strong woman who lets her guard down and exposes her vulnerability".

In 2017, Ladd starred in the made-for-television thriller Stage Fright, as an opera soprano facing a series of dangers, and in the independent drama Blue Line, as a woman who, along with her best friend, go on a crime spree to rob her abusive husband and escape her marriage.

Filmography

Film

Television

References

External links
 
 

American child actresses
American film actresses
American television actresses
Living people
Actresses from Hollywood, Los Angeles
20th-century American actresses
21st-century American actresses
Ladd family (show business)
American people of Jewish descent
Year of birth missing (living people)